Fiona Mary Petty-Fitzmaurice, Marchioness of Lansdowne  (née Merritt; born October 1954), known professionally as Fiona Shelburne, is a British peeress and interior designer. Since 2022, she has served as one of six Queen's companions to Queen Camilla.

Biography
Born Fiona Mary Merritt in October 1954, in 1987, she became the second wife of Charles Petty-Fitzmaurice, Earl of Shelburne, later the 9th Marquess of Landsdowne. She held the courtesy title Countess of Shelburne from her marriage until the death of her father-in-law in 1999, when she then became The Marchioness of Lansdowne. The family seat is Bowood House, Wiltshire.  

She trained as an interior designer at the Inchbald School of Design and worked for Colefax & Fowler. She first met her husband on a working visit to Bowood while employed by Charles Hammond in the early 1980s. Lady Lansdowne and her husband have overseen the restoration of Bowood House.

Lady Lansdowne was appointed a deputy lieutenant of Wiltshire in 2019. She was High Sheriff of Wiltshire for 2022–2023. The Lansdownes are close friends of King Charles III and Queen Camilla, and in 2022, Lady Lansdowne was appointed as one of the Queen's six Queen's companions, the modern equivalent of ladies-in-waiting.

References

Living people
1954 births
British marchionesses
Members of the British Royal Household
British interior designers
Deputy Lieutenants of Wiltshire
High Sheriffs of Wiltshire
Petty-Fitzmaurice family